Around the Fur is the second studio album by American alternative metal band Deftones, released on October 28, 1997, by Maverick Records. The songs "My Own Summer (Shove It)" and "Be Quiet and Drive (Far Away)" were released as singles with accompanying music videos. The album was certified Gold by the RIAA in June 1999, and was eventually certified Platinum in 2011.

Background
Around the Fur has been described as alternative metal, nu metal, post-hardcore, and alternative rock. Guitarist Stephen Carpenter has since reflected, "We didn't really pay much attention to that. I remember when these subgenre names didn't exist. It was just metal. So I don't think we made a decision to step away [from nu metal] – we've never paid attention to what anyone else was doing. We just did what we thought was right, and tried to make a killer album." Producer Terry Date stated that the band wanted to become "more sophisticated" with Around the Fur. Lyrically, much of the album addresses topics such as juvenile perception, existential angst, sex, romance, violence, the death of loved ones, and break ups.

It was the second album to feature Frank Delgado under additional personnel; he eventually joined the band officially in 1999. The song "Headup" featured additional vocals by Max Cavalera of Soulfly. It was written by Cavalera and Deftones singer Chino Moreno as a way of venting some of their pain over the loss of Dana Wells, Cavalera's stepson and Chino's friend. The band name "Soulfly" was taken from a portmanteau invented for the song. While the album's lyrics were included in the booklet, not every single word was printed. A good example is the song "Lhabia": In the verses, Moreno whispers statements that are hard to decipher. There is also one verse missing from the song "Headup".

The album cover was shot by photographer Rick Kosick during a late-night party in Seattle where the band was recording. Upon seeing the candid photo of a woman, the band decided that they wanted to use it as the album cover. Kosick was unsure who the woman was, so the band had to find and track her down to obtain permission to use the photo, which she eventually granted. The woman appearing on the cover is Washington State resident Lisa M. Hughes, a friend of Stephen Carpenter. Hughes spoke publicly about the cover for the first time during the album's 20th anniversary in 2017. Moreno has since expressed his dislike of the cover, calling it "horrible".

Composition

"When we went in to make this record, we really didn't have a set idea of what we wanted to come out with," said Moreno in a 1998 interview with Chart magazine. However, he felt that the album "fell into place" once the band had settled into the studio. The band expanded its sound, spending more time with producer Terry Date, and giving more thought to the album's production. Abe Cunningham varied his drum sound and experimented by using different types of snare drums on almost every track. The album was praised for its loud-soft dynamics, the flow of the tracks, Moreno's unusual vocals, and the strong rhythm section grooves created by Cunningham and bassist Chi Cheng.

The album opener, "My Own Summer (Shove It)", was written in 1994 by Moreno during an excessively hot stretch of the summer in Seattle. The frequent sleeping led him to cover his windows and frequently envision a post-apocalyptic world where people would disappear off the streets. The second track, "Lhabia", expresses the frustration of a woman forced into prostitution, while simultaneously being exposed to a drug-defendant lifestyle. The third track, "Mascara", depicts the effects of domestic abuse, while also taking influence from Moreno's own tension within his marriage with his then-wife Celeste Schroeder. The album's title track takes aim at the materialistic feelings brought by fame and the superficial sense of shallowness brought on by multiple women. "Rickets" is an aim at parental type figures who constantly criticize others while expressing a lack of desire to absorb their advice.

Release

The album was highly anticipated, and propelled the band to fame in the alternative metal scene on the strength of radio and MTV airplay for the singles "My Own Summer (Shove It)" (released December 22, 1997) and "Be Quiet and Drive (Far Away)" (released March 9, 1998). The album's title track was also released as a promotional single. 
Around the Fur sold 43,000 copies in its first week of release, and entered the Billboard 200 at No. 29 (its peak position), remaining on the charts for 17 weeks. Around the Fur went on to reach RIAA gold status on June 24, 1999, and platinum status on June 7, 2011.

When the album was released on Spotify, it contained an alternate version of "Headup" running a full minute longer than the original release.

Touring
In May 1997, while Around the Fur was in the process of being recorded, the band performed two concerts at Bojangles in Sacramento. These were their first shows since December 1996, with the band debuting several Around the Fur songs that were still in the demo stages. Their next performance was on September 11, 1997, at The Press Club in San Francisco. This concert saw the debut of live staples "Be Quiet and Drive (Far Away)" and "My Own Summer (Shove It)". Following the album's release in October 1997, Deftones toured North America/Europe with Sacramento bands Far and Will Haven. The tour continued into early 1998. Later in 1998, they made appearances at the Warped Tour (in the United States, New Zealand and Australia), Pinkpop Festival, Roskilde Festival and Ozzfest, as well as releasing a live EP on April 10, 1998. In September 1998, Deftones toured with Red Hot Chili Peppers, who were playing their first shows in over 6 years with guitarist John Frusciante.

Critical reception

The album generally received positive reviews from music critics. Greg Corrao of CMJ New Music Monthly remarked in November 1997, "this hard-hitting noise-fest finds the band once again furthering the cause of riff-heavy, bludgeoning rock also championed by the likes of Soundgarden, Helmet and Kyuss", further adding that, "those heavy sensibilities are paired with vocalist Chino Moreno's yearning whine, allowing the band to create [their] own kind of sub-metal." He concluded his review by asserting that, "with Around the Fur, Deftones have carved out their own place in heavy music's hard beaten path toward the year 2000." In a retrospective review, AllMusic critic Stephen Thomas Erlewine wrote: "Deftones tap into the same alternative metal vibe as Korn and L7, and while they don't have catchy riffs or a fully developed sound, Around the Fur suggests they're about to come into their own". James P. Wisdom of Pitchfork described the songs from the album as "intense, harsh tunes", while Punknews.org thought that the album "showcased a band aware of their flaws, structure and lyrical approach, and thus achieved an overall great improvement in said areas". Robert Christgau was less receptive, dismissing it as a "dud".

In 2015, critic Saby Reyes-Kulkarni of Diffuser stated that "[o]n their landmark second album, Deftones infused elements of new wave and shoegaze to define their future direction. Alt-metal would never be the same." Reyes-Kulkarni observed that the album "captures the first full blossoming of the duality that has come to define the Sacramento quintet's musical identity" and "set a new standard for '90s alt-metal and opened doors to what's possible when bands find the motivation to get heavy away from the brutish impulses that typically drive aggressive music." He further noted that, while the album "sounds undeniably thicker and heavier" than the band's debut album Adrenaline, Chino Moreno's new wave and post-punk influences became increasingly evident: "On Around the Fur, Moreno's love of new wave groups like Depeche Mode and The Cure began to rear its head in earnest."

Louder Sound included it as one of the ten best albums released in 1997. They also listed it as being one of the best metal albums released between 1996 and 1997. When Consequence of Sound ranked the eight albums Deftones had released as of May 2020, Around the Fur was placed at number four.

Track listing
All songs written by Deftones, except "Headup" by Deftones and Max Cavalera.

Notes
 "MX" itself ends at 4:52. On CD and digital editions of the album, it's followed by two hidden tracks, separated between 27 minutes and 21 seconds of silence; "Bong Hit" and "Damone". "Bong Hit" (19:32–19:55) begins, following 14 minutes and 40 seconds of silence. After an additional 12 minutes and 41 seconds of silence, "Damone" (32:36–37:18) ends the album. On vinyl editions of the album, neither of the hidden tracks on are featured, and the album ends after "MX".

Personnel
Adapted credits from the liner notes of Around the Fur.

Band members
Chino Moreno – lead vocals
Stephen Carpenter – guitar
Chi Cheng – bass, backing vocals
Abe Cunningham – drums

Additional personnel
Frank Delgado – turntables (on "My Own Summer (Shove It)", "Around the Fur", "Dai the Flu", "Headup" and "MX")
Matt Bayles – assistant to Terry Date
Max Cavalera – additional vocals and guitar (on "Headup")
Annalynn Cunningham – additional vocals (on "MX")
Terry Date – production, mixing, recording
Steve Durkee – assistant to Ulrich Wild
Ted Jensen – mastering
Rick Kosick – photography
Kevin Reagan – art direction and design
Ulrich Wild – mixing, recording, digital editing

Charts

Album

Singles

Certifications

Other media and cultural references
 "My Own Summer (Shove It)" appeared on The Matrix: Music from the Motion Picture, released on March 30, 1999.
 A poster of the album art was visible in the 1999 film Universal Soldier: The Return. 
 "Headup" was used in its entirety in the 2001 film Manic.
 "Be Quiet and Drive (Far Away)" was featured on the soundtracks of two extreme sports computer games: Dave Mirra Freestyle BMX (2000) and Tony Hawk: Shred (2010).
 English alternative rock band Muse have cited Deftones as a root influence and sometimes use the riff to "Headup" as an outro to their song "New Born" during live performances.

References

External links
 

Deftones albums
1997 albums
Maverick Records albums
Nu metal albums by American artists
Albums produced by Terry Date